Dioptis uniguttata is a moth of the family Notodontidae first described by William Warren in 1901. It is found in Colombia and Ecuador.

References

Moths described in 1901
Notodontidae of South America